"Til You Do Me Right" is a song by American R&B group After 7. The song is the opening track on the group's third studio album, Reflections, and was issued as the album's first single in June 1995. It was their final hit on the US Billboard Hot 100, peaking at number 31 in 1995, and it also reached the top 20 in Australia and New Zealand; in the former nation, the song is certified gold for shipping over 35,000 copies.

Charts

Weekly charts

Year-end charts

Certifications

Release history

References

External links
 

1995 singles
1995 songs
After 7 songs
Song recordings produced by Babyface (musician)
Songs written by Babyface (musician)
Songs written by Kevon Edmonds
Virgin Records singles